Himandhoo (Dhivehi: ހިމެންދޫ) is one of the inhabited islands of the Alif Alif Atoll in the Maldives.

Geography
A short seaplane journey from Velana International Airport would take approximately 25–45 minutes to reach this pristine piece of land in the Northern Alif Atoll. Speedboat transfer options are also available to reach the island.

Demography

Economy

Tourism
The exclusivity of the area around this unique Maldivian island has been known by many international travellers for a long time. Well known dive spots and white sand beaches around the area are so famous that it is an attraction for thousands of travellers every year. The island is gifted with its very own unbeatable house reef for snorkelers, beautiful beaches, infinite lagoon for kite and wind surfers. Around 700+ islanders who live on the Island are well known for their kindness and always-friendly attitude towards life, which is now creating better opportunities and transforming their lives opening new doors to everlasting peace and to become an exemplary destination for the hospitality business.

History
In 2007 a standoff occurred when Maldivan authorities investigating the 2007 Malé bombing attempted to enter the Dar-al-Khuir mosque on the island.  A 40-hour standoff ensued between authorities and male congregants, ending in the arrest of 60 men and boys, and injuries to 30 police officers.

References

Islands of the Maldives